Arkivoc (Archive for Organic Chemistry) is a peer-reviewed open access scientific journal covering all aspects of organic chemistry. It is published by the non-profit organization Arkat USA, which was established in 2000 through a personal donation from Alan R. Katritzky and Linde Katritzky. Arkivoc is the primary publication of Arkat USA. According to the Journal Citation Reports, the journal has a 2014 impact factor of 1.165, ranking it 37th out of 57 journals in the category "Chemistry, Organic".

Abstracting and Indexing 
According to the Journal Citation Reports, the journal has a 2018 impact factor of 1.253. The journal is indexed in Web of Science: Science Citation Index Expanded.

References

External links 
 

Chemistry journals
Publications established in 2000
English-language journals
Open access journals